The Spine is the tenth full-length studio album by They Might Be Giants. The album was released on July 5, 2004 in the UK, and July 13 in the US. The album was released alongside a companion EP, The Spine Surfs Alone. It was preceded by the Indestructible Object EP, which featured two tracks that appear on The Spine.

Promotion
Two music videos were produced for The Spine. The first, a Flash-animated video for "Experimental Film", was created in conjunction with the creators of Homestar Runner, and features Homestar Runner characters. An animated music video for "Bastard Wants to Hit Me" appears on the DVD for Venue Songs. The video was directed by Aaron Sorenson and Courtney Booker of Laika. The video was nominated for the Annie Award for "Best Animated Television Commercial" in 2005.

Track listing

Reception

The Spine received mixed reviews from critics. Writing for AllMusic, Heather Phares found that John and John had already exhausted the album's best content on the preceding EP, Indestructible Object. Phares concluded that the album contained a few engaging hooks, but was overall inconsistent. Josh Modell of The AV Club berated the album's lack of "idiosyncrasies", and reported that The Spine was generally unsurprising. Contrarily, Patrick Schabe of PopMatters lauded the album for its uncharacteristically traditional rock arrangements.

References

External links
The Spine on This Might Be A Wiki

2004 albums
Self-released albums
They Might Be Giants albums
Albums produced by Pat Dillett
Cooking Vinyl albums
Idlewild Recordings albums
Zoë Records albums